The PL postcode area, also known as the Plymouth postcode area, is a group of 35 postcode districts in South West England, within 25 post towns. These cover west Devon (including Plymouth, Tavistock, Ivybridge, Yelverton and Lifton) and east Cornwall (including St Austell, Bodmin, Liskeard, Launceston, Looe, Saltash, Torpoint, Callington, Wadebridge, Boscastle, Calstock, Camelford, Delabole, Fowey, Gunnislake, Lostwithiel, Padstow, Par, Port Isaac and Tintagel).



Coverage
The approximate coverage of the postal districts:

! PL1
| PLYMOUTH
| Plymouth, Devonport, The Hoe, Millbridge, Stoke, Stonehouse
| Plymouth City Council
|-
! PL2
| PLYMOUTH
| Beacon Park, Ford, Keyham, North Prospect, Pennycross, Home Park
| Plymouth City Council
|-
! PL3
| PLYMOUTH
| Efford, Hartley, Laira, Mannamead, Milehouse, Peverell, Higher Compton
| Plymouth City Council
|-
! PL4
| PLYMOUTH
| Barbican, Lipson, Mount Gould, Mutley, Prince Rock, St. Judes
| Plymouth City Council
|-
! PL5
| PLYMOUTH
| Crownhill, Ernesettle, Honicknowle, Whitleigh, St. Budeaux, Tamerton Foliot 
| Plymouth City Council
|-
! PL6
| PLYMOUTH
| Derriford, Eggbuckland, Estover, Leigham, Roborough, SouthwayLopwell, Woolwell, Bickleigh
| Plymouth City CouncilSouth Hams
|-
! PL7
| PLYMOUTH
| Plympton, Sparkwell
| Plymouth City CouncilSouth Hams
|-
! PL8
| PLYMOUTH
| Brixton, Newton Ferrers, Noss Mayo, Yealmpton
| South Hams
|-
! PL9
| PLYMOUTH
| Plymstock, Heybrook Bay, Mount Batten, Wembury
| Plymouth City Council
|-
! PL10
| TORPOINT
| Cawsand, Cremyll, Fort Picklecombe, Freathy, Kingsand, Millbrook
| Cornwall Council
|-
! PL11
| TORPOINT
| Torpoint, Antony, Crafthole, Downderry, Seaton, Sheviock, St John
| Cornwall Council
|-
! PL12
| SALTASH
| Saltash, Hatt, Landrake, St Germans, Tideford, Trerulefoot
| Cornwall Council
|-
! PL13
| LOOE
| Looe, Lansallos, Polperro
| Cornwall Council
|-
! PL14
| LISKEARD
| Liskeard, Dobwalls, Doublebois, Minions, St Cleer, St Ive, St Neot
| Cornwall Council
|- 
! PL15
| LAUNCESTON
| Launceston, Bolventor, Lezant, South Petherwin, Treneglos
| Cornwall Council,  Torridge
|-
! PL16
| LIFTON
| Lifton, Broadwoodwidger, Marystow
| West Devon, Torridge
|-
! PL17
| CALLINGTON
| Callington, Ashton, Bray Shop, Kelly Bray, South Hill
| Cornwall Council
|-
!rowspan=2|PL18
| CALSTOCK
| Calstock
|rowspan=2|Cornwall Council
|-
| GUNNISLAKE
| Gunnislake, Albaston
|-
! PL19
| TAVISTOCK
| Tavistock, Bradstone, Mary Tavy, Morwellham, Peter Tavy, Whitchurch
| West Devon
|-
! PL20
| YELVERTON
| Yelverton, Bellever, Crapstone, Horrabridge, Postbridge, Princetown, Two Bridges
| West Devon
|-
! PL21
| IVYBRIDGE
| Ivybridge, Brownston, Cornwood, Ermington, Modbury, Ugborough
| South Hams
|-
! PL22
| LOSTWITHIEL
| Lostwithiel, Boconnoc, Lanlivery, Lerryn, St Veep
| Cornwall Council
|-
! PL23
| FOWEY
| Fowey, Bodinnick, Golant, Polruan
| Cornwall Council
|-
! PL24
| PAR
| Par, Polkerris, St Blazey, Tywardreath
| Cornwall Council
|-
! PL25
| ST. AUSTELL
| St Austell, Carlyon Bay, Charlestown, Trewoon
| Cornwall Council
|-
! PL26
| ST. AUSTELL
| East Portholland, Foxhole, Gorran Haven, Mevagissey, St Dennis, St Ewe, Sticker
| Cornwall Council
|-
! PL27
| WADEBRIDGE
| Wadebridge, Little Petherick, Polzeath, Rock, St Eval, St Minver, Trebetherick
| Cornwall Council
|-
! PL28
| PADSTOW
| Padstow, Crugmeer, Porthcothan, St Merryn, Trevone, Treyarnon
| Cornwall Council
|-
! PL29
| PORT ISAAC
| Port Isaac, Port Gaverne, Port Quin, St Endellion, Trelights
| Cornwall Council
|-
! PL30
| BODMIN
| Blisland, Lanivet, Luxulyan, Nanstallon, St Kew, St Mabyn, Temple, Withiel
| Cornwall Council
|-
! PL31
| BODMIN
| Bodmin, Dunmere
| Cornwall Council
|-
! PL32
| CAMELFORD
| Camelford, Davidstow, Lanteglos-by-Camelford, Otterham, Tresinney
| Cornwall Council
|-
! PL33
| DELABOLE
| Delabole, Trebarwith, Westdowns
| Cornwall Council
|-
! PL34
| TINTAGEL
| Tintagel, Bossiney, Trewarmett
| Cornwall Council
|-
! PL35
| BOSCASTLE
| Boscastle, Lesnewth, Trevalga
| Cornwall Council
|-
! style="background:#FFFFFF;"|PL95
| style="background:#FFFFFF;"|PLYMOUTH
| style="background:#FFFFFF;"|
| style="background:#FFFFFF;"|non-geographic
|}

Map

See also
Postcode Address File
List of postcode areas in the United Kingdom

References

External links
 Royal Mail's Postcode Address File
A quick introduction to Royal Mail's Postcode Address File (PAF)

Postcode areas covering South West England
Cornwall-related lists